Tim Ryan is senior partner and chairman of PricewaterhouseCoopers.

Early life 
Ryan grew up in Hyde Park and Dedham, Massachusetts. He worked for Roche Bros. while in high school and college.

Activism 
Ryan gained recognition in 2021 for his activism toward workplace inclusion and diversity. In 2017 as a senior partner, Ryan's initial mission was to transform the diversity and inclusion policies within PwC after he was prompted by a Black employee's internal email which called out the workplace's lack of discussion about what was happening culturally in America to people of color. (This followed the fatal shootings of Philando Castillo and Alton Sterling in the summer of 2016.) After advocating internally, he founded, on behalf of PwC, the CEO Action for Diversity & Inclusion™ pledge. To date, the pledge has garnered more than 1,600 signatures from Fortune 500 companies and progressive executives.

Personal life 
Ryan resides Walpole, Massachusetts. He has a brother named Pat.

References

Businesspeople from Dedham, Massachusetts
People from Walpole, Massachusetts
Babson College alumni
PricewaterhouseCoopers people
Living people
Year of birth missing (living people)